Selangor Football Club (Malay: Kelab Bola Sepak Selangor) (who formerly known as Selangor FA) is a Malaysian professional football club based in the city of Shah Alam, Selangor, that currently competes in the Malaysia Super League, the top tier of Malaysian football. The club is nicknamed the Red Giants. Officially founded in 1936 by the Football Association of Selangor (FAS), the association built its football development as a result of a merger with the Selangor Association Football League (SAFL - established in 1905) and forming the professional football team known as Selangor FA. On 2 October 2020, the club officially made its privatization under a new entity as Selangor Football Club after it was officially approved by the Football Association of Malaysia (FAM) on 29 September 2020. The club currently plays its home games at the Petaling Jaya Stadium after the club's original home ground, the Shah Alam Stadium, was closed to undergo major renovation and rebuilding work which was prolonged for an extended period of time. 

Selangor are the most successful and most decorated club in Malaysia, in terms of overall honours won with 52 top-qualifying trophies and 61 trophies collectively. Domestically, Selangor have won a total of 6 Malaysia top division league titles which includes 2 Malaysia Super League titles (the league that the club currently plays in), 1 Premier League 1 title, 2 Semi-Pro League Division 1 titles and 1 Malaysian League title. In cup competitions, the club have a record of 33 Malaysia Cups, a joint-best 5 Malaysia FA Cups and a record of 8 Malaysia Charity Shields. In addition, the club have also won 2 second-division titles, 1 Malaysia Premier League title and 1 Semi-Pro League Division 2 title and between 1951 and 1973, 7 Malaysia FAM Cups where the Malaysia FAM Cup acted as a secondary knockout cup competition between state teams after the Malaysia Cup.

Selangor were also the first Malaysian club to qualify and enter an Asian continental club tournament, the Asian Champion Club Tournament where the club finished as runners-up in 1967, the first edition of the Asian top-flight continental club tournament, which was later rebranded as the AFC Champions League in 2002. The club were also the first team in Malaysian football history to achieve a league and cup double by winning the Malaysian League and Malaysia Cup in 1984.

The club also gave rise to many Malaysian football stars who brought success to both club and country such as Mokhtar Dahari, R. Arumugam, Abdul Ghani Minhat, Wong Choon Wah, Santokh Singh, Soh Chin Aun, Zainal Abidin Hassan, Azman Adnan, Rusdi Suparman, Amri Yahyah, and Safee Sali and many others. The club is also one of the best supported clubs in Malaysia and across the Asian continent and holds several rivalries, most notably with Singapore, Kuala Lumpur City and Johor Darul Ta'zim.

History

1905–1936: Beginnings
A Selangor state football association was founded in 1905 to establish and manage an internal state league, called the Selangor Association Football League (SAFL). The first cup competition was sponsored by the British Resident of Selangor, R.G. Watson. There were also reports that the association was led by British Residents at that time.

Due to an internal conflict, some officials left the organization in 1926 and founded the Selangor Football Association (SFA), a new organization. The dispute between the SAFL and the SFA continued for almost ten years before the two sides negotiated back on a deal for the betterment of the future of football in the state of Selangor. Finally, the two football entities officially merged on 22 February 1936, under the name of the Football Association of Selangor (FAS) (Malay: Persatuan Bola Sepak Selangor) and forming Selangor FA to represent the state of Selangor.

During this period, Selangor won their first ever piece of silverware in the form of the Malaya Cup in 1922, in a 3–2 win over Singapore FA (a rivalry that would come to define Malaysian football in future years) and going on to win the Malaya Cup a further five times in 1927, 1928, 1929, 1935 and 1936.

MAHA Stadium (Malayan Agri-Horticultural Association Stadium): Selangor FA's First Stadium

The proposal to build a stadium that can accommodate 5,000 spectators was first voiced in 1927, and from the very beginning the venue was built in collaboration between MAHA and the Selangor football association. Initially three sites were nominated for the venue; at Gaol Road (now Jalan Hang Tuah), at the intersection of Jalan Bukit Bintang and Circular Road (now Jalan Tun Razak, possibly on the site of where Prince Court Medical Centre now stands), and at Jalan Pudu. The site chosen was ultimately at the intersection of Circular Road and Jalan Ampang, and according to press reports of the time, it began construction in 1928 and was completed the following year. The specific location of the stadium is not known, it is only said in press reports to be behind a police station at this intersection, which is the current Jalan Tun Razak police station.

When it was completed, MAHA was sued by the surrounding residents because it was said that the football matches held there disturbed public order. Although the suit was in favor of the stadium owners, Selangor only began to make the stadium their official ‘home ground’ in 1931, in the Malaya Cup against Penang on July 18, a match that ended in a 5–3 victory for Selangor. The squad played a total of 20 times at this stadium between 1931 and 1940, and won 14 times. The eight finals of the Malaya Cup were held here with Selangor being finalists four times. However, the club won only one final, in a 2–0 win over Singapore FA in 1935. Their last match here was nine years later, against Kedah in the Malaya Cup on 20 July 1940.

In the aftermath of the Japanese occupation during World War II from 1941 to 1945, the MAHA Stadium was damaged which made it unusable and was subsequently destroyed. The current site of the former MAHA Stadium has now become an area for car dealers, with a shopping mall right next to the Jalan Tun Razak police station, also included are residential and embassy areas. In this neighborhood there are several fields and open spaces owned by Kelab Aman, SJKC Chung Hwa (P), and a cricket association.

1937–1960: Between World War II and Independence

The outbreak of World War II slowed down FAS' efforts to develop domestic football. The effort was started aggressively as soon as the war ended. Efforts to upgrade state football continued with the association laying out plans to construct a new football stadium for the state team. The state team prior to the war played at MAHA Stadium in Jalan Ampang and in the intervening years at Selangor Field Club (now Dataran Merdeka), the team's new home ground clearly required a stadium in line with the association's direction. The association management met the Mayor of Kuala Lumpur several times for permission to construct the stadium but a solution couldn't be found. The impasse meant that Selangor's home stadium plan had to be put on hold.

However, the appointment of Tunku Abdul Rahman Putra Al-Haj as the first official FAS president (who also held the presidency of the Football Association of Malaysia at that time) was a right move for the association. After becoming Prime Minister of the newly independent Federation of Malaya in 1957, Tunku Abdul Rahman pioneered the stadium construction business and ordered the construction of Stadium Merdeka to celebrate the country's independence as well as being Selangor's official new home stadium. Stadium Merdeka also served as the occasional home ground of the Malaysia national football team as well as the staging of international sporting events.

After 1951, Tunku Abdul Rahman vacated the presidency of the FAS. He was succeeded by the Independent MP for Bangsar (now known as Bangsar) constituency and also a teacher by profession, S.C.E. Singam, who became the second official FAS president until 1953, where he was succeeded by K. Sundram. Between 1951 and 1960, the club won two Malaysia Cups in 1956 and 1959, finishing as runners-up in 1957 and 2 Malaysia FAM Cups in 1953 and 1960, finishing as runners-up in 1952 and 1955.

1961–1983: Era of Harun Idris' Leadership

Dato' Seri Harun Idris is synonymous with football in Selangor and Malaysia in the 1960s to the early 1980s. He ran as president of the FAS for 21 years from 1961 to 1983. During his leadership, Selangor won 15 Malaysia Cups as well as doing a lot of positive changes for the association. The club was originally headquartered at the MCA building in Jalan Ampang before the construction of Wisma FAS in 1973 at Merdeka Stadium under the president's (who was also the Chief Minister of Selangor at the time) and club manager Hamzah Abu Samah's efforts.

In that time, the club won the Malaysia Cup 15 times in 1961, 1962, 1963, 1966, 1968, 1969, 1971, 1972, 1973, 1975, 1976, 1978, 1979, 1981 and 1982 as well as the Malaysia FAM Cup 5 times in 1961, 1962, 1966, 1968 and 1972.

1983–1989: Ahmad Razali Mohd Ali era

Tan Sri , who was the Chief Minister of Selangor at that time became FAS President from 1983 to 1989. In the 1984 Malaysian League season, under his leadership Selangor won their first ever Malaysian top division football league title, a league that was first introduced with a winner's trophy in 1982. Additionally, Selangor also won the Malaysia Cup in 1984 to achieve a historic league and cup double, a first in the history of Malaysian football.

The club also won the Malaysia Cup in 1986 where club legends Mokhtar Dahari and R. Arumugam made their final appearances in a Malaysia Cup Final. In 1989, the club also won the rebranded Semi-Pro League Division 1 that replaced the Malaysian League as the country's top-flight football league and in turn was the final trophy under Ahmad Razali's leadership.

1990–1995: All-New Stadium and Wisma FAS

After a series of successes for the club, the FAS decided to end the club's tenure at Stadium Merdeka to fulfill the ambitions of the club. As a result, an all-new stadium development had to be approved and built. Finally, on January 1, 1990, a groundbreaking ceremony for the new stadium was held in Shah Alam, Selangor. With the construction of the new Shah Alam Stadium, the ground could accommodate up to 80,000 spectators at a time. Its structure is the longest free gate in the world in that era. It also become one of the major landmarks in Shah Alam, Selangor due to its impressive size and design. The stadium has been the home of Selangor since it opened in July 1994, after the club moved from Stadium Merdeka. FAS also moved to their new headquarters in Kelana Jaya, Selangor which was known as Wisma FAS in the mid-1990s. In that time, the club won the Semi-Pro League Division 1 twice in 1989 and 1990, and won the Semi-Pro League Division 2 in 1993 after suffering relegation the year before, as well as a Malaysia FA Cup triumph in 1991, a Malaysia Cup triumph in 1995 and a Malaysia Charity Shield triumph in 1990.

1996–2010: 17 Trophies Collected

The period between 1996 and 2010 was Selangor's most successful period despite a relegation in between. In the 1996 season, with Ken Worden as head coach, they won the Malaysia Charity Shield and the Malaysia Cup. The following season, Steve Wicks was appointed as head coach and guided the club to success with a trifecta of trophies in the Malaysia Charity Shield, the Malaysia FA Cup and the Malaysia Cup. Under the guidance of coach K. Rajagopal from 1999 to 2000, Selangor won the 2000 Premier League 1 title, which was the top-flight league in Malaysia at the time and secured their fourth league title. Ken Worden was appointed again and won the Malaysia Charity Shield and the Malaysia Cup in the 2002 season.

In the 2004 season, the club were relegated to the brand new second-division, the Malaysia Premier League. Dollah Salleh was appointed as head coach and won the 2005 Malaysia Premier League, the Malaysia FA Cup and the Malaysia Cup, completing a unique treble and won immediate promotion back to the Malaysia Super League. However, in the following seasons the club did not win any trophies as this was attributed back to the club's poor management.

In the 2009 season, K. Devan was appointed as head coach and also the club manager. It was the first time in the club's history that both roles had been given to the same person. K. Devan is considered to have one of the best managerial records for the club. He won the Malaysia Super League in 2009 and 2010, the 2009 Malaysia FA Cup and the Malaysia Charity Shield in 2009 and 2010, with the 2009 triumphs being the club's second ever double winning season after the 1984 success. As of 2022, 2010 was the last time that the club won the top-flight league in Malaysia, the Malaysia Super League.

2011–2017: Period of decline

The club went through in what is considered to be the worst period in their history having gone through 7 different head coaches. However, despite that, in 2015, the club won the Malaysia Cup for a record 33rd time under the management of former player Mehmet Duraković. That tally is still unsurpassed and the club remains as one of the most successful in the competition's history. Affairs off the pitch however were not great as management problems during the tenure of Mohamed Azmin Ali when he led the club as FAS President caused Selangor to vacate their home ground, the Shah Alam Stadium and the internal conflict between Exco members and management of the club also led to a decline in the club's performance on the pitch.

2018–present: Tengku Amir Shah era

In July 2018, The Crown Prince of Selangor, Tengku Amir Shah (RMS) was appointed as the new president of FAS. He took over the seat left by Datuk Seri Subahan Kamal. Since Tengku Amir Shah took over the presidency, a lot of effort was made to improve the club. This began a new chapter for the club in the modern day.

In July 2019, they moved to a new 400,000-square foot facility in Section 5, Shah Alam called the Selangor FA Training Centre (now known as Selangor FC Training Centre) which had a three-year lease from the Government of Selangor. The facility also sees the administrative headquarters of the Football Association of Selangor, club administration office, indoor training, training pitches, gym, first team lounge, physio treatment area, locker room as well as enabling the administrators and coaches to be put under one roof.

On 9 October 2019, as part of the privatization effort, FAS decided to only manage the U17 squad, U14 squad, U12 squad, the Women's squad and focused on the association's roles in the state of Selangor. The club also took over PKNS FC and acted as a reserve team known as Selangor II and play in the Malaysia Premier League while the existing Selangor U20 and Selangor U18 squads were known as Selangor III & IV. All 3 teams were streamlined and restructured as part of a developmental path to the first-team squad.

On 2 October 2020, Selangor announced that their privatisation documentations submission has been approved by the Football Association of Malaysia (FAM). The club who have been operating officially as a football association (FA), revealed that it will be known as Kelab Bolasepak Selangor, Malay for Selangor Football Club (Selangor FC) after the 2020 domestic football season ends in Malaysia, starting from 1 December 2020. The football team was managed by a newly established entity; Red Giants FC Sdn. Bhd. and the football team was rebranded as Selangor Football Club.

Brand and identity

Crest and colours 
thumb|150px|right|Selangor badge since 2 October 2020 after the club was officially privatized and rebranded under a new entity

The original emblem that was first created in 1936 as a result of the merger between the Selangor Football Association (SFA) and Selangor Association Football League (SAFL) contained the symbol of the wildebeest (gaurus). In the early 1970s, the FA Selangor symbol the head of the wildebeest was replaced with the flag and coat of arms of Selangor and the English lettering in the FA Selangor emblem was written in Malay.

The crest is shaped like a shield, while the emblem on the upper part of the crest is derived from the Selangor State Council coat of arms. The colour characteristics on the crest is the main colour of the state of Selangor which symbolizes Bravery for red and Royalty for yellow. Both of these colors are linked to the state flag which follows the identity of Selangor. The logo is then completed by featuring the state's blazon on the top of it.

Reserve teams 
 Selangor II
 Selangor III & IV

Kits 

From the 1970s onwards, the Selangor team kit was manufactured by various companies including Admiral, Puma, Adidas, Lotto, Kappa and Joma.

From 1985, Selangor was sponsored by various companies including Dunhill, EON, Celcom, Syarikat Bekalan Air Selangor (SYABAS), Telekom Malaysia (TM), and Menteri Besar Incorporated (MBI). Since 2014, the Selangor kit has been sponsored by the government of Selangor under the names of six state government corporations. The company that sponsored the club the longest in its history was Dunhill from 1985 to 2004 with Dunhill having sponsored all the Malaysian clubs during that time before being banned by the Malaysian Health Ministry to decrease the popularity of smoking and tobacco in Malaysia.

From the 2019 season, the club kits were produced and sponsored by Spanish sportswear company, Joma which covers the sponsorship of a full jersey set for the Super League squad, Premier League squad, President's Cup squad, Youth Cup squad, men's and women's futsal squad including training sets. Joma's sponsorship also covers clothing for all FAS League referees including travel casual clothing and cash sponsorship to the club. On 23 September 2021, Selangor's official site announced an extended partnership with Joma until the 2023 season.

Social media 

The online presence is believed to be one of the strongest amongst the clubs in Malaysia. Official sites selangorfc.com run by the club include Facebook (Selangor FC), Instagram (@selangorfc) (@rgphysioclinic), YouTube (Selangor FC), Twitter (@selangorfc), TikTok (@selangor_fc), Non-fungible token (selangorfc.com/nft) and Discord (software) (https://discord.com/invite/JT6ThGN3sp) pages which fans can follow and receive the latest information about the club news, match, etc.

Selangor's fans pages officially created and run by fans included:

Facebook - UltraSel Curva, Anak Selangor Fan Club Official, Selangor Soccer Fan Club, Selangor Fans, Selamanya Selangor Red Giants and many more.

Instagram - @ultrasel_ _ , @asfc_official, @selangorsoccerfanclub, selangorfans_official, officialssrg , Twitter @FansSelangor , and many more.

e-Sports  

On 19 January 2023, Selangor has made history by becoming the first football team in Malaysia to have their own Mobile Legends: Bang Bang (MLBB) team (known as the Yoodo Red Giants) to compete in the Mobile Legends Professional League (MPL) for the 11th season. The announcement ceremony was held at the Selangor FC Training Center, Shah Alam.

Ownership and finances 
The holding company of Selangor football club, Red Giants FC Sdn. Bhd. is a private limited company, with approximately RM10 million in shares issued by the state government of Selangor as paid-up capital. The club was privatized at the end of the 2019 season. Among the shareholders for management are the current Crown Prince of Selangor, Tengku Amir Shah as majority shareholder, Perbadanan Kemajuan Negeri Selangor (PKNS), Menteri Besar Incorporated (MBI) and the Football Association of Selangor (FAS). The total paid-up capital for this holding company is currently unknown.

Grounds

Stadium 
 

Selangor have used several grounds throughout their history. The club's first ground was the MAHA Stadium (collaboration with the Malayan Agri-Horticultural Association) at the intersection of Circular Road (Jalan Tun Razak) and Jalan Ampang, circa 1931 until 1940. Following the aftermath of the Japanese occupation during World War II from 1941 to 1945, the MAHA Stadium was damaged, which made it unusable and was subsequently destroyed. At the same time, Selangor also played at Selangor Club Field (now known as Dataran Merdeka) from their founding in 1936 until the independence of Malaya in 1957.

In September 1956, the club president, and also Malaysia's first Prime Minister, Tunku Abdul Rahman, ordered the construction of the Merdeka Stadium as the new home stadium for the Red Giants and also to celebrate the country's upcoming independence as well. The stadium finished construction on 21 August 1957 and was inaugurated on 31 August 1957, the day the Federation of Malaya declared independence from British rule. Right after the declaration of independence, the club played their home matches at Merdeka Stadium, which would become the club's home ground for the next 38 years. The first football match took place on 1 September 1957 which saw Malaya defeat Burma 5–2 in a friendly match. In this stadium, which hosted 20,000 spectators, Selangor celebrated its first Malaysian league title in 1984.

After some successes, the club management decided that the Merdeka Stadium was not big enough for the ambitions of the club, and thus a new stadium was built and inaugurated on 16 July 1994. This was the Shah Alam Stadium, which could host an astounding number of up to 80,372 supporters, and became the club's home stadium for 22 years until 2016. The first match at the stadium was played between Selangor and Scottish club Dundee United in an invitational tournament, which resulted in a 1–1 draw, with the first goal being scored by Billy McKinlay. Other teams in the tournament were Bayern Munich, Leeds United, the Australian Olympic team "Olyroos", and Flamengo, who won the tournament.

In 2017, an internal crisis occurred within the club management, which resulted in the resignation of the club's president, Mohamed Azmin Ali, who was also the Menteri Besar of Selangor at the time. The crisis began when executive members of the club reportedly rejected the notion of privatization of Selangor Football Club, which was suggested by the club's president. The crisis forced the club to move to a temporary home ground at the Selayang Stadium after the Selangor state government denied the club access to use their traditional home ground, the Shah Alam Stadium.

The following year, the club management of Selangor decided to switch the club's home ground to the Kuala Lumpur Stadium for the 2018 season. The club's president, Subahan Kamal, stated that the Kuala Lumpur Stadium could generate a higher income and that the Selayang Stadium did not meet the needed lighting criteria required by the FMLLP which is organizing body of the football league in Malaysia. Selangor originally proposed to use the club's traditional home ground, the Shah Alam Stadium and the Bukit Jalil National Stadium. However, both applications were rejected by the Selangor state government and the FMLLP respectively, with the latter's reason being that certain matches could collide with the Malaysia national football team's calendar.

The club moved back to the Shah Alam Stadium in the middle of the 2018 season after the new president, Tengku Amir Shah was appointed. In early 2020 the home of the Red Giants, the Shah Alam Stadium was closed for 3 years due to major renovation and rebuilding work. In the middle of the 2020 season, Selangor played at the UiTM Stadium as an interim home ground following Shah Alam Stadium's temporary closure. For the 2021 season until present, the club's interim home ground venue is at the MBPJ Stadium.

On 15 July 2022, the Menteri Besar of Selangor, Amirudin Shari, stated that the Selangor government have appointed the Malaysian Resources Corporation Berhad (MRCB) to refurbish the stadium and its surrounding sporting facilities with a cost of up to RM787 million, that will start in early 2023.

Training Centre 

The training facility is located at SUK Sports Complex, Section 5, Shah Alam. The 400,000 square feet training centre named the Selangor FC Training Centre (who formely known as Selangor FA Training Center) was officiated by the president of the club, Tengku Amir Shah in a ceremony attended by the Menteri Besar of Selangor Amirudin Shari, club sponsors, association Exco members and media representatives on 24 July 2019. The facility also has an office complex for the management staff and technical staff, two FIFA sized pitches, gymnasium, physio treatment area, a player lounge, changing room, pantry, etc.

Vizione Holdings Berhad, a strategic partner to Selangor was the biggest contributor to the construction of the RM1.5 million facility.

Players

First-team squad

Out on loan

Development Squad and Academy
 

List of Development Squad and Academy players with first team appearances.

Former captains

All-time appearances and goalscorer

Management & coaching staff

Management

Current technical staff

Notable managers

Former Managers / Head Coaches

Head coach

Season by season records

Honours

 
  shared record
 (** runner-up)

Doubles and Trebles
Doubles
League and Malaysia Cup (1): 1984
FA Cup and Malaysia Cup (1): 1997
League and FA Cup (1): 2009
Trebles
League, FA Cup and Malaysia Cup (1): 2005

Supporters 
Since their inception in 1936, Selangor have developed a loyal, passionate and dedicated following. The club supporters are recognised for the most their loyalty, and long-supporting fans in Asia.

.

The fans' song of choice and the most commonly heard is a rendition of Red Yellow. The anthems will play before every match. Ultrasel Curva's most frequently sung song is "Kami Datang Lagi" , "Kau & Aku Selamanya" , "Selangor Sampai Mati", “Ale ale, Selangor ale", "Kaulah Kebanggaan" and "Tentang Perjuangan". Other chants that are always heard are "Come on Selangor", "Inilah Barisan Kita", "You're Obsessed", "Slaughter your enemy" and many more.

Selangor has collaborated with several local artists to produce songs such as on 5 May 1997 with KRU - Viva Selangor. On 28 May 2022, Selangor also collaborated with Altimet in the production of the Third Jersey Kits for the 2022 season and also produced a special album Langgam Gendang Perang as a sign of Altimet's support for his beloved team.

Selangor has various supporters' clubs such as Ultrasel Curva, Selangor Fans Club, Anak Selangor Fan Club and many other small fan clubs that are considered as regulars in the Shah Alam Stadium. Ultrasel Curva is one of the largest supporters group of Selangor. Wherever Selangor play, the group will be there to support. They always gather at the Gate 2 stand in the Shah Alam Stadium which they nicknamed it the Green Curva Nord. Accompanied by the drumline, they will stand and chant passionately for the entire game and wave huge flags occasionally.

Selangor Soccer Fans Club is the second largest supporters group of the club. The fan club was formed by a group of loyal Selangor fans from many states that always gather up when the Red Giants play. The main colours for these supporters are red and yellow, which are the official colours for all the fan clubs in the state of Selangor. The fan club's target is to create a football academy with the help and support of former Selangor players such as Shahril Arshad, Jamsari Sabian and many more.

Red Giants Team Card is one of the new initiatives to appreciate the 12th player of the club, which are the supporters. The memberships have multiple benefits to the supporters and it also as an entry ticket to the home games matches. The membership needs to be renewed on a yearly basis. The club also actively partakes in using the internet and social media to communicate with the fans.

Rivalries 

Selangor has a historical derby with Perak and Singapore FA known as the Malayan El Clasico while matches with Kuala Lumpur are known as the Klang Valley Derby. More recently, Selangor developed a rivalry with Johor Darul Ta'zim due to the latter's recent run of success in the 2010s as well as with PKNS before Selangor took over the former to become its feeder team Selangor II to play in the second tier Malaysia Premier League.

Singapore FA
The rivalry with Singapore was a football rivalry that occurred between 1921 and 1994. It is the oldest football derby in Malaysia. The rivalry arises from the numerous times the two clubs have battled for the Malaysia Cup title. With 57 titles between them (33 for Selangor and 24 for Singapore) this fixture has become known as one of the finest Malaysia Cup match-ups in history. The rivalry ended in 1994 after the Football Association of Singapore decided to pull out its representative side in the Malaysian football league system due to disputes with the Football Association of Malaysia over gate receipts and concentrate its efforts on the development of local football. The last ever meeting between the two teams was on 10 December 1994 where Selangor and Singapore played out a 2–2 draw in a Malaysia Cup game which Singapore narrowly won 3–2 on aggregate, before going on to win the Malaysia Cup that year. In terms of head-to-head Singapore edge out Selangor with 22 wins to 19 wins but Selangor still lead the overall Malaysia Cup tally with 33 triumphs.

Kuala Lumpur City
Kuala Lumpur City (who formely known as Kuala Lumpur FA) have always been Selangor's fierce local rivals. The rivalry occurred due to the two states' geographical locations with the derby contested between the two most developed states in Malaysia; Selangor Darul Ehsan and the Federal Territory of Kuala Lumpur. The rivalry goes back over 40 years when it started in the 80s. Selangor enjoyed success in the decade with triumphs in the Malaysian League and Malaysia Cup where they won the league in 1984 and the cup four times in 1981, 1982, 1984 and 1986 before Kuala Lumpur became a force in the latter competition with three consecutive Malaysia Cup triumphs from 1987 to 1989, winning the league in 1986 as Federal Territory FA before being renamed as Kuala Lumpur FA in 1987. Selangor then won another league title in 1989 while Kuala Lumpur became only the second team in Malaysian football history to achieve a double when they won the league and the cup in 1988.

The 90s saw mixed fortunes for both sides as Selangor won the league only once in the decade in 1990 before suffering relegations in 1992 and again in 1998, winning immediate promotions on both occasions in 1993 and 1999, but also won the Malaysia Cup three consecutive times from 1995 to 1997 and the Malaysia FA Cup in 1997. Kuala Lumpur meanwhile was becoming cup specialists in the newly formed Malaysia FA Cup as they won the competition in 1993, 1994 and 1999, but success in the league eluded them.

By the turn of the new millennium, the early 2000s saw both Selangor and Kuala Lumpur having contrasting fortunes. Selangor won their first league title in a decade when they took the top flight title in 2000, with Kuala Lumpur winning the Charity Cup that same year. Selangor would enjoy continued success in the Malaysia Cup, winning in 2002 while Kuala Lumpur suffered relegation that same year. By 2004 both teams were playing second division football together when Selangor suffered relegation in 2003, albeit in different groups. Selangor was promoted in 2005, achieving a unique treble in the process by winning the second-tier league, Malaysia Cup and Malaysia FA Cup.

Over the course of the late 2000s the rivalry waned slightly as Selangor solidified its top-flight status with two more league titles in 2009 and 2010 along with an FA Cup triumph in 2009. Kuala Lumpur meanwhile soldiered on in the second division without achieving promotion for the rest of the 2000s. The rivalry was renewed in 2010 when Kuala Lumpur got promoted to the Malaysia Super League after a seven-year spell in the second division, by virtue of Harimau Muda being restricted to playing in the Malaysia Premier League despite winning the title in 2009 and allowing Kuala Lumpur to be promoted. However, Kuala Lumpur's tenure in the top flight was to be short-lived when they were relegated back to the Malaysia Premier League in 2012. The following year, in 2013, Kuala Lumpur was relegated to the then third-tier Malaysia FAM League for the first time in its history. At the end of the 2017 season, Kuala Lumpur were promoted to the Malaysia Super League in 2018 before being relegated again in 2019. The rivalry was finally rekindled once again in 2021 when Kuala Lumpur won promotion again by virtue of Terengganu II finishing second in the 2020 Malaysia Premier League and not being allowed promotion, thus giving the promotion slot to Kuala Lumpur.

The rekindled rivalry came to a head in the 2021 Malaysia Cup Quarter-finals when the renamed Kuala Lumpur City FC beat Selangor FC over two legs to qualify for the semi-finals which resulted in a pitch invasion from the Kuala Lumpur supporters. Kuala Lumpur then went on to win the 2021 Malaysia Cup to win their first Malaysia Cup since 1989, and their first piece of silverware since 2000.

PKNS
Prior to being taken over, PKNS were one of Selangor's smaller local rivals. The rivalry occurred due to both clubs being in the same geographical location. However, as part of the privatization process and to restructure football in the state of Selangor, PKNS was absorbed and Selangor II was formed.

Johor Darul Ta'zim

In the 2012, Selangor developed a rivalry with Johor Darul Ta'zim. This was due to the latter's run of recent success in the decade to become a powerhouse in the Malaysian footballing scene. The investment that has gone into Johor Darul Ta'zim has been substantial with the team winning eight successive Malaysia Super League titles, two Malaysia Cups, a Malaysia FA Cup triumph and an AFC Cup title in 2015. Selangor went through a period of decline during Johor Darul Ta'zim's rise until new ownership came to Selangor to revive the team's fortunes.

See also 

 List of Selangor F.C. players
 List of Selangor F.C. records and statistics
 2020 Selangor F.C. season
 Klang Valley Derby and Selangor–Singapore rivalry
 F.A. Selangor Women's
 Selangor F.C. II
 Selangor F.C. III & IV
 Shah Alam Stadium
 Football Association of Selangor

Footnotes

References

External links 
 Selangor Official website

 
Malaysia Super League clubs
Football clubs in Malaysia
1936 establishments in British Malaya
Association football clubs established in 1936